Vair (from Latin varius "variegated"), originating as a processed form of squirrel fur, gave its name to a set of different patterns used in heraldry. Heraldic vair represents a kind of fur common in the Middle Ages, made from pieces of the greyish-blue backs of squirrels sewn together with pieces of the animals' white underbellies. Vair is the second-most common fur in heraldry, after ermine.

Origins 

The word vair, with its variant forms veir and vairé, was brought into Middle English from Old French, from Latin  "variegated", and has been alternatively termed  (Latin, meaning "variegated work").

The squirrel in question is a variety of the Eurasian red squirrel, Sciurus vulgaris. In the coldest parts of Northern and Central Europe, especially the Baltic region, the winter coat of this squirrel is blue-grey on the back and white on the belly, and was much used for the lining of cloaks called mantles. It was sewn together in alternating cup-shaped pieces of back and belly fur, resulting in a pattern of grey-blue and grey-white which, when simplified in heraldic drawing and painting, became blue and white in alternating pieces.

Variations 
In early heraldry, vair was represented by means of straight horizontal lines alternating with wavy lines. Later it mutated into a pattern of bell or pot-like shapes, conventionally known as panes or "vair bells", of argent and azure, arranged in horizontal rows, so that the panes of one tincture form the upper part of the row, while those of the opposite tincture are on the bottom. The early form of the fur is still sometimes found, under the name vair ondé (wavy vair) or vair ancien (ancient vair)(Ger. Wolkenfeh, "cloud vair"). The only mandatory rule concerning the choice of tincture is the respect of the heraldic rule of tincture, that orders the use of a metal and a colour.

When the pattern of vair is used with other colours, the field is termed vairé or vairy of the tinctures used.  Normally vairé consists of one metal and one colour, although ermine or one of its variants is sometimes used, with an ermine spot appearing in each pane of that tincture. Vairé of four colours (Ger. Buntfeh, "gay-coloured" or "checked vair") is also known, usually consisting of two metals and two colours.

Traditionally vair was produced in three sizes, and each size came to be depicted in armory.  A field consisting of only three rows, representing the largest size, was termed gros vair or beffroi (from the same root as the English word belfry); vair of four rows was simply vair, while if there were six rows, representing the smallest size, it was menu-vair (whence the English word miniver).  This distinction is not generally observed in English heraldry, and is not strictly observed in continental heraldry, although in French heraldry it is customary to specify the number of rows if there are more than four.

Arrangement variants 

There are also forms of vair in which the arrangement of the rows is changed. The most familiar is counter-vair (Fr. contre vair), in which succeeding rows are reversed instead of staggered, so that the bases of the panes of each tincture are opposite those of the same tincture in adjoining rows.  Less common is vair in pale (Fr. vair en pal or vair appointé, Ger. Pfahlfeh), in which the panes of each tincture are arranged in vertical columns.  In German heraldry one finds Stürzpfahlfeh, or reversed vair in pale.  Vair in bend (Fr. vair en bande) and vair in bend sinister (Fr. vair en barre), in which the panes are arranged in diagonal rows, is found in continental heraldry.  Vair in point (Fr. vair en pointe, Ger. Wogenfeh, "wave vair") is formed by reversing alternate rows, as in counter-vair, and then displacing them by half the width of a pane, forming an undulating pattern across adjoining rows.  German heraldry also uses a form called Wechselfeh, or "alternate vair", in which each pane is divided in half along a vertical line, one side being argent and the other azure. Any of these may be combined with size or color variations, though the variants which changed several aspects are correspondingly rarer.

Potent and other shapes  
Potent (Ger. Sturzkrückenfeh, "upside-down crutch vair") is a similar pattern, consisting of T-shapes. In this form, the familiar "vair bell" is replaced by a T-shaped figure, known as a "potent" due to its resemblance to a crutch. The pattern used with tinctures other than argent and azure is termed potenté or potenty of those colours. The appearance of this shape is thought by some authorities to have originated from crude draftsmanship, although others regard it as an old and perfectly acceptable variation. A regularly encountered variation of potent is counter-potent or potent-counter-potent (Ger. Gegensturzkrückenfeh), which is produced in the same fashion as counter-vair; potent in point (Ger. Verschobenes Gegensturzkrückenfeh, "displaced counter-potent") is also found, and there is no reason why one could not, in principle, have potent in bend, potent of four colours, etc.

Three other, rarer furs are also seen in continental heraldry, of unclear derivation but most likely from variations on vair made to imitate other types of animals: in plumeté or plumetty, the panes are depicted as feathers; and in papelonné or papellony they are depicted as scales, resembling those of a butterfly's wings, whence the name is derived.  In German heraldry there is a fur known as Kürsch, or "vair bellies", consisting of panes depicted hairy and brown.  Here the phrase "vair bellies" may be a misnomer, as the belly of the red squirrel is always white, although its summer coat is indeed reddish brown.

See also 

Tincture (heraldry)

References 

 Veale, Elspeth M.: The English Fur Trade in the Later Middle Ages, 2nd Edition, London Folio Society 2005. 

Furs
Visual motifs